Amgaon Vidhan Sabha seat is one of the constituencies of Maharashtra Legislative Assembly, in India.

Overview
Amgaon is one of the four Vidhan Sabha constituencies located in the Gondia district. and comprises the entire Deori, Salekasa and Amgaon tehsils of the district. This constituency is reserved for the candidates belonging to the Scheduled tribes.

Amgaon is part of the Gadchiroli-Chimur Lok Sabha constituency along with five other Vidhan Sabha segments, namely Armori, Gadchiroli and Aheri in the Gadchiroli district and Brahmapuri and Chimur in the Chandrapur district. Before 2009, it used to be part of the now defunct Bhandara (Lok Sabha constituency).

Members of Legislative Assembly
 1962 : Narayan Bahekar (Praja Samajwadi Party)
 1967 : Laxmanrao Mankar (Bharatiya Jana Sangh) 
 1972 : Swarupchand Ajmera (INC)
 1978 : Mahadeo Shivankar (Janata Party) 
 1980 : Mahadeorao Shiwankar (Bharatiya Janata Party) 
 1985 : Mahadeorao Shiwankar (BJP) 
 1990 : Bharat Bahekar (Congress) 
 1995 : Mahadeorao Shiwankar (BJP) 
 1999 : Mahadeorao Shiwankar (BJP) 
 2014 : Sanjay Puram, Bharatiya Janata Party
 2019 : Sahasram Maruti Korote (Indian National Congress)

Election Results

1962 Assembly Election
 Narayan Mohani Bahekar (PSP) : 9,631 votes
 Laxman Bisan Mankar  (JS) : 5,260 votes

1967 Assembly Election
 L. B. Mankar (BJS) : 13,844 votes
 N. M. Bahekar (SSP) : 13,218

1972 Assembly Election
 Swarupchand Ajmera (INC) : 31,000 votes
 Laxman Rao Bisanji Mankar (BJS) : 20,418

1978 Assembly Election
 Shiwankar, Mahadeorao Sukaji (JNP) : 35,727 votes 
 Bhaktawarti, Dayaram Dashrath (INC(I)) : 29,197 votes

1980 Assembly Election
 Mahadeorao Sukaji Shivankar (BJP) : 38,522 votes
 Jain Kewalchand Kanhaiyalal (Indira Congress) : 33,859

1985 Assembly Election
 Mahadeorao Sukaji Shionkar (BJP) : 51,114 votes
 Jain Swaroopchand Jethmal (INC) : 36,897

1990 Assembly Election
 Bahekar, Bharatbhau Narayanbhau (INC) : 41,134 votes 
 Nagpure Bhersingh Dukalu (BJP) : 28,991

1999 Assembly Election
 Shivankar, Mahadeorao Sukaji (BJP) : 65,705 votes
 Raut Ramratanbapu Bharatrajbapu (INC) : 63140

2014 Assembly Election
 Puram Sanjay Hanwantrao (BJP) : 62,590 votes
 Ramrtanbapu Bhartrajbapu Raut (INC) : 44295

2019 Assembly Election
 Sahasram Maruti Korote (Indian National Congress) : 88,265 votes
 Sanjay Hanmantrao Puram (Bharatiya Janata Party) : 80,845

See also
 Amgaon
 List of constituencies of Maharashtra Vidhan Sabha

References

Assembly constituencies of Maharashtra
Gondia district